Marco Bandinelli, also known as Marchino di Guido Reni, was an Italian painter of the Baroque period. He began as a model and cook for Guido Reni in Bologna.

References

17th-century Italian painters
Italian male painters
Painters from Bologna
Italian Baroque painters
Year of death unknown
Year of birth unknown